The Tucson Amigos were a soccer club based in Tucson, Arizona that competed in the SISL, USISL and United Soccer Leagues. The founder of the Tucson Amigos was Dennis Archer, a local business owner who owned the Tucson Amigos Indoor Soccer Center.

Year-by-year

Coaches

Indoor
  Ron Fox: 1991
  Carlos Acosta: 1991–1993

Outdoor
  Wolfgang Weber: 1991–1994, 1996
  Luis Dabo: 1995
  Chris Hawken: 1997–1999

References

Defunct soccer clubs in Arizona
Sports in Tucson, Arizona
Defunct indoor soccer clubs in the United States
Defunct Premier Development League teams
USISL teams
1989 establishments in Arizona
Association football clubs established in 1989
1999 disestablishments in Arizona
Association football clubs disestablished in 1999